List of software by Apple cover different types of software written by Apple Inc. They include:

Archiving, backup, restore, recovery
Archive Utility – built-in archive file handler
Backup – built-in backup software
Time Machine (macOS) – built-in backup software

CD and DVD authoring
DVD Studio Pro – DVD authoring application
iDVD – a basic DVD-authoring application

Audio-specific software
GarageBand
Logic Express – prosumer music production
Logic Studio – music writing studio package by Apple Inc.
Apple Loops Utility – production and organisation of Apple Loops
Apple Qmaster and Qadministrator
Logic Pro – digital audio workstation
Soundtrack Pro

Chat (text, voice, image, video)
FaceTime – videoconferencing between Mac, iPhone, iPad and iPod Touch
iMessage – instant messaging between Mac, and iDevices 
iChat – instant messaging and videoconferencing (discontinued since OS X 10.8 Mountain Lion in favour of FaceTime and iMessage)

Developer tools and IDEs
Xcode – IDE made by Apple, which comes as a part of macOS and is available as a downloadon, was called Project Builders of Florida tech
Swift Playgrounds - an educational tool and development environment for the Swift programming language

Email clients
Apple Mail – the bundled email client
Claris Emailer – classic Mac OS only, no longer available

Layout and desktop publishing
Preview (macOS) - basic image and PDF viewer and editor 
Pages – part of iWork
iBooks Author - discontinued interactive book creating software for Apple Books

Graphic editors
iPhoto
Photos
Aperture (software)
MacPaint

Integrated software technologies 

Finder
Path Finder
QuickTime
Terminal
X11.app

Music Player 
iTunes
Music

Media center
Front Row (software)

Networking and telecommunications
Apple Remote Desktop
Final Cut Pro

News aggregators
Apple News

Office and productivity
Address Book – bundled with macOS
AppleWorks – word processor, spreadsheet, and presentation applications (discontinued)
FileMaker
iCal – calendar management, bundled with macOS
iWork – suite:
Pages – word processor application
Numbers – spreadsheet application
Keynote – presentation application

Operating systems

Apple DOS
Apple ProDOS
Apple_Lisa#Lisa_OS
Classic Mac OS
Darwin – the BSD-licensed core of macOS
macOS – originally named "Mac OS X" until 2012 and then "OS X" until 2016
macOS Server – the server computing variant of macOS

Text editors
TextEdit

Utilities
Activity Monitor – default system monitor for hardware and software
Automator – built-in, utility to automate repetitive tasks
Dashboard – built-in macOS widgets
Grab (software) – built-in macOS screenshot utility
iSync – syncing software, bundled with Mac OS X up to 10.6
Sherlock – file searching (version 2), web services (version 3)
Stickies – put Post-It Note-like notes on the desktop

Support for non-Macintosh software
Boot Camp – a multi-boot utility built into macOS from 10.5
Virtual PC – full virtualization software allows running other operating systems, such as Windows and Linux, on PowerPC Macs (discontinued in 2007)

Video
DVD Player (Apple) – DVD player software built into macOS
Final Cut Express
Final Cut Studio – audio-video editing suite:
Apple Qmaster
Cinema Tools
Compressor
DVD Studio Pro
Final Cut Pro
LiveType
Motion 2
Soundtrack Pro
iMovie – basic video editing application
QuickTime – including its Player and QuickTime Pro editor

Others
Safari (web browser)-  graphical web browser
Apple Books - an e-book reading and store application
Calculator (Apple) - a basic calculator application
Calendar (Apple) - a personal calendar app
Contacts (Apple) - a computerized address book
Find My - an asset tracking app and service
Font Book - a font manager 
Launchpad (macOS) - an application launcher
Apple Mail - an email client
Apple Maps - a web mapping app and service 
Messages (Apple) - an instant messaging software application
Notes (Apple) - a notetaking app
Photo Booth - a software application for taking photos and videos
Apple Podcasts - an audio streaming service and media player application
Reminders (Apple) - a task management program
Siri - a virtual assistant
Apple TV app - a media player software program
Mac App Store -  a digital distribution platform for macOS apps
MainStage
iWeb

Older Software
Apple Media Tool
HyperCard - software application and development kit for Apple Macintosh and Apple IIGS computers
MacApp - object oriented application framework for the classic Mac OS
Macintosh Programmer's Workshop - a software development environment for the Classic Mac OS operating system
MacDraw -  a vector graphic drawing application
MacPaint - a raster graphics editor
AppleLink -  Apple Computer's online service for its dealers, third-party developers, and users, and the client software used to access it
EWorld - an online service operated by Apple Inc.
MacTerminal -  telecommunications and terminal emulation application software program
Claris Resolve - a spreadsheet computer program
MacProject- a project management and scheduling business application
MacWrite - word processor application 
A/UX - Unix-based operating system for Macintosh computers
MkLinux - an open-source software computer operating system

See also 
List of Macintosh software

References 

 List of software by Apple Inc.